Judo competitions at the 2021 Southeast Asian Games took place at Hoài Đức District Sporting Hall in Hanoi, Vietnam from 18 to 22 May 2022.

Medal table

Medalists

Kata

Men's combat

Women's combat

Mixed combat

References

Judo
2021